Bob Bryan and Mike Bryan were the defending champions, but lost in the semifinals to Leander Paes and Radek Štěpánek.  The loss ended the Bryan brothers' bid to win a calendar grand slam.

Leander Paes and Radek Štěpánek won the title, defeating Alexander Peya and Bruno Soares in the final, 6–1, 6–3.

Seeds

Draw

Finals

Top half

Section 1

Section 2

Bottom half

Section 3

Section 4

References

External links
2013 US Open – Men's draws and results at the International Tennis Federation

Men's Doubles
US Open - Men's Doubles
US Open (tennis) by year – Men's doubles